Lee Jin-taek (born 13 April 1972) is a retired South Korean high jumper.

Career
His personal best jump is 2.34 metres, achieved in June 1997 in Seoul. This was the South Korean record.

Achievements

References
 
 

1972 births
Living people
South Korean male high jumpers
Athletes (track and field) at the 1992 Summer Olympics
Athletes (track and field) at the 1996 Summer Olympics
Athletes (track and field) at the 2000 Summer Olympics
Olympic athletes of South Korea
Asian Games medalists in athletics (track and field)
Kyungpook National University alumni
Athletes (track and field) at the 1994 Asian Games
Athletes (track and field) at the 1998 Asian Games
Athletes (track and field) at the 2002 Asian Games
Asian Games gold medalists for South Korea
Asian Games silver medalists for South Korea
Medalists at the 1994 Asian Games
Medalists at the 1998 Asian Games
Medalists at the 2002 Asian Games
Universiade medalists in athletics (track and field)
Universiade gold medalists for South Korea
Universiade bronze medalists for South Korea
20th-century South Korean people
21st-century South Korean people